Diddlebury is a small village and large civil parish in Shropshire, England. The population of the Civil Ward in 2011 was 670.

Public buildings
St Peter's parish church has unusual but distinctive herringbone internal stonework facing to the north wall of the nave from Anglo-Saxon times.

There is a primary school in the village, which takes in pupils from surrounding villages too, called Corvedale CofE. It currently has around 85 pupils.

It has a village hall, built in 1951, near the church and school. It is mainly used for clubs and local events. The village hall has since been renovated, which finished around 2019.

Civil parish
The civil parish of Diddlebury is large, encompassing land on both sides of the River Corve. Between the River Corve and the Pye Brook, to the east of Diddlebury, lie the ringwork and other remaining earthworks of Corfham Castle. The hamlets of Bouldon and Peaton lie in the east of the parish, along the course of the Pye Brook. The Corvedale Three Castles Walk runs through the parish.

Electoral division
The parish forms part of the electoral division (for electing members to Shropshire Council) of Corvedale.

See also
Listed buildings in Diddlebury

References

External links 

Diddlebury Parish Council
photos of Diddlebury and surrounding area on geograph
Diddlebury Parish Website

Civil parishes in Shropshire
Villages in Shropshire